Äsköping is a locality situated in Katrineholm Municipality, Södermanland County, Sweden with 342 inhabitants in 2010. It is the main settlement of the Julita district of the municipality and also located close to the namesake manor.

Riksdag elections

References 

Populated places in Södermanland County
Populated places in Katrineholm Municipality